Arua District is a district in the Northern Region of Uganda. Like many other Ugandan districts, it shares its name with its administrative center of Arua. The name Arua is said to be derived from the Lugbara name for prison (Arujo) and prisoner (Aru), since the white settlers (Belgians and later British) had a detention center at Arua Hill.

Location
Arua District is bordered by Yumbe District to the north, Adjumani District to the northeast, Amuru District to the east, Nebbi District to the southeast, Zombo District to the southwest, the Democratic Republic of the Congo (DRC) to the west, and Maracha District to the northwest. The coordinates of the district are:03 00N, 31 10E.

Ethnicities
The predominate ethnic group in the district are the Lugbara people

Overview
Arua District got its name from Arua town. In the late 1970s, the Ugandan president at the time Godfrey Binaisa declared that all districts/provinces acquire their names from their regional capital so that is how Arua district inherited the name from Arua town. The district originally included Aringa County, which was later split off to become Yumbe District.

The district is the birthplace of former President Idi Amin. Arua District was a springboard for some units of the Uganda People's Defense Force who entered the DRC at the beginning of the Second Congo War.

Arua District is a peaceful district save for the disruption caused in the late 1990s by the Lord's Resistance Army rebels on the Karuma-Pakwach road that provides the main road link into the district. In 2005, the northeastern part of the district was split off as the separate, new district of Koboko District.

Arua District has five counties after three of the original six counties were split off. Koboko was granted district status. Maracha was, in 2006, also granted district status, (Maracha District). Initially, Terego County was also included in Maracha District (Maracha-Terego District). However, failing to agree on were the new district headquarters should be located, Terego County opted to remain part of the larger Arua District. Later, Terego and Madi-Okollo were each offered district statuses effective July 2020. The remaining counties in Arua District are: Vurra and Ayivu; where the Arua District headquarters are located.

Population
The 1991 national population census estimated the population of the district at about 368,200. In 2002, the national population census gave a population estimate of 559,100, with an annual growth rate of 4 percent. In 2012, the population of Arua District was estimated at 776,700.

Economic activities
Located in a corner of the country that borders both South Sudan and the DRC, a significant amount of local economic activity is the result of cross-border trade. Agriculture is the backbone of Arua District's economy:

Food and cash crops

 Groundnuts
 Beans
 Maize
 Millet
 Simsim
 Mangoes
 Avocado
 Cassava
 Matooke
 Flowers
 Tobacco

Domesticated livestock and other fauna

African goats
Boer goats
Hybrid goats
Broilers
Layers
Fish farming
Pigs
Bee keeping

Due to a high influx of refugees from South Sudan (estimated at 50,000 at one time), the natural environment in the district has been severely stressed, causing deforestation in some areas. The refugee population extensively engages in the growth of tobacco to raise cash for survival thus putting severe pressure on the land.

In 2008 and 2009, honey is steadily replacing tobacco as a leading income stream, with a ready international market. Piggery is also on the increase in the district. The district produces about 30 tons of fish from over 600 private fish farms and from the River Nile. The district has about 117,000 head of local Zebu cattle. However the district milk output remains low.

The biggest asset of the district is perhaps the continued prevalence of peace and security for the last 25 years and denunciation of rebellion which has attracted many developmental projects. Major achievements include infrastructural transformation such as the tarmacking of the Arua to Karuma Highway, the West Nile Rural Electrification Project and numerous telephone communication networks that have been established in the region. During 2013, the tarmacking of the Vurra-Arua-Koboko-Oraba Road began.

See also
 Arua Airport
 West Nile sub-region
 Districts of Uganda
 Lugbara cuisine
 Ombaci

References

External links
 Arua District Portal

 
West Nile sub-region
Districts of Uganda
Northern Region, Uganda